The 2022–23 Syracuse Orange men's basketball team represented Syracuse University during the 2022–23 NCAA Division I men's basketball season. The Orange were led by 47th-year head coach Jim Boeheim and played their home games at JMA Wireless Dome in Syracuse, New York as tenth-year members of the Atlantic Coast Conference.

This season marked the final season coached by long–time head coach Jim Boeheim, who was replaced following the season by former Syracuse point guard and assistant coach Adrian Autry.

Previous season
The Orange finished the 2021–22 season 16–17, 9–11 in ACC play to finish in ninth place.  As the ninth seed in the ACC tournament, they defeated eighth seed Florida State in the Second Round before losing to first seed Duke in the Quarterfinals. They were not invited to the NCAA tournament or the NIT.

Offseason

Departures

Incoming transfers

Recruiting classes

2022 recruiting class

Roster

Schedule and results
Source:

|-
!colspan=12 style=| Exhibition

|-
!colspan=12 style=| Regular Season

|-
!colspan=12 style=| ACC Tournament

Rankings

*AP does not release post-NCAA Tournament rankings

References

Syracuse Orange men's basketball seasons
Syracuse
Syracuse basketball, men
Syracuse basketball, men